Nardorex zorzini is an extinct nektonic predatory aulopiformid fish from Late Cretaceous Italy.

Description
Nardorex zorzini is a superficially mackerel-like animal whose overall anatomy places it within the order Aulopiformes.  However, the details of its osteology make its placement within Aulopiformes problematic.

Distribution
Specimens of N. zorzini are found in Campanian to Maastrichtian-aged marine strata of Nardo, Italy.

References

Aulopiformes
Ray-finned fish enigmatic taxa
Cretaceous bony fish
Prehistoric ray-finned fish genera
Cretaceous fish of Europe